Circus building may refer to:

 Circus (building), a structure in ancient Rome built for spectacles and chariot racing
 Circus Building, an exhibit building at Shelburne Museum, Vermont